Pontoise is the train station serving the city of Pontoise and the surrounding suburbs. The station is a large building situated on Place Charles de Gaulle itself at the bottom end of Rue Thiers. Rue Thiers was built for the station and links Pontoise's Medieval centre to the railway.

The station was opened to link Paris to Dieppe, it is parallel to the line with a long footbridge stretching over the lines to the Canrobert bus station. Trains no longer serve Dieppe (now rerouted via Rouen) but is well served by regional trains (Transilien) to Paris St-Lazare and Paris Nord. Pontoise Station is also served by RER C which uses a new bridge built of the River Oise to increase capacity.

See also 
 List of stations of the Paris RER
 List of stations of the Paris Métro

External links

 
 

Railway stations in Val-d'Oise
Railway stations in France opened in 1863